The Eckert-Greifendorff projection is an equal-area map projection described by Max Eckert-Greifendorff in 1935. Unlike his previous six projections, It is not pseudocylindrical.

Development
Directly inspired by the Hammer projection, Eckert-Greifendorff suggested the use of the equatorial form of the Lambert azimuthal equal-area projection instead of Aitoff's use of the azimuthal equidistant projection:

where laea and laea are the x and y components of the equatorial Lambert azimuthal equal-area projection. Written out explicitly:

The inverse is calculated with the intermediate variable

The longitude and latitudes can then be calculated by

where λ is the longitude from the central meridian and φ is the latitude.

See also

List of map projections
Hammer projection
Eckert projection

References

Map projections
Equal-area projections